Melanoplus cinereus, the grayish sagebrush grasshopper, is a species of spur-throated grasshopper in the family Acrididae. It is found in North America.

Subspecies
These two subspecies belong to the species Melanoplus cinereus:
 Melanoplus cinereus cinereus Scudder, 1878 i c g
 Melanoplus cinereus cyanipes Scudder, 1897 i c g b
Data sources: i = ITIS, c = Catalogue of Life, g = GBIF, b = Bugguide.net

References

Melanoplinae
Articles created by Qbugbot
Insects described in 1878